The 2nd Political Committee of the Workers' Party of Korea (WPK), officially the Political Committee of the 2nd Central Committee (2nd CC), was elected in the immediate aftermath of the 2nd WPK Congress on 30 March 1948 by the 2nd CC's 1st Plenary Session. The composition changed on the merger of the Workers' Party of North Korea and the Workers' Party of South Korea (WPSK) on 24 June 1953, and was again changed after a purge of WPSK-affiliated communists on 6 August 1953.

It sat until the 3rd Congress, which abolished the Political Committee and elected the 3rd Standing Committee in its place.

1st Plenary Session (1948–49)

1st Joint Plenary Session (1949–53)
Note that Pak Chong-ae was elected to the 2nd Political Committee on 4 November 1951 by the 4th Joint Plenary Session of the 2nd Central Committee.

6th Joint Plenary Session (1953–56)

References

Citations

Bibliography
 
 
  

2nd Political Committee of the Workers' Party of Korea
1948 establishments in North Korea
1956 disestablishments in North Korea